Muleño Club de Fútbol is a football team based in Mula, Murcia. Founded in 1986, the team plays in Tercera División – Group 13, holding home games at Estadio Municipal.

Season to season

17 seasons in Tercera División

Notable players
 Damián Timpani
 Pedro León
 Javi García

References

External links
Preferente Autonómica
trecera.com profile

Football clubs in the Region of Murcia
Association football clubs established in 1989
Divisiones Regionales de Fútbol clubs
1989 establishments in Spain